Kevin Michael O'Sullivan (born December 27, 1968) is an American college baseball coach and former player.  O'Sullivan is the current head coach of the Florida Gators baseball team of the University of Florida.  O'Sullivan is best known for leading the Gators to the program's first College World Series national championship win in 2017.  O'Sullivan also led the program to three consecutive appearances in the College World Series from 2010 to 2012 and four consecutive appearances from 2015 to 2018.  He became the winningest coach in program history in 2021, surpassing Dave Fuller's 1975 record of 557 wins.

Early years 

O'Sullivan was born December 27, 1968, in Goshen, New York.  O'Sullivan attended Jupiter High School in Jupiter, Florida, and played high school baseball for the Jupiter Warriors.

College career 

O'Sullivan was a catcher during his college playing career.  He played his freshman and sophomore seasons at Florida Community College in Jacksonville, Florida.  After his sophomore year, he transferred to the University of Virginia in Charlottesville, Virginia, where he played for the Virginia Cavaliers baseball team during his junior and senior years and was a member of the 1991 Atlantic Coast Conference baseball tournament All-Tournament Team.

O'Sullivan graduated Florida Community College with an associate's degree in 1989, and the University of Virginia with a bachelor's degree in sports medicine in 1991.  He later earned a master's degree in exercise science and wellness from Florida Atlantic University in Boca Raton, Florida.

Coaching career 

In 1997, O'Sullivan managed the Bourne Braves, a collegiate summer baseball team in the prestigious Cape Cod Baseball League, and was named coach of the year. His Bourne team featured future major leaguer Mark Mulder.

On September 1, 1998, O'Sullivan was named an assistant coach at Clemson University.

O'Sullivan accepted the baseball head coaching position at the University of Florida on June 13, 2007, replacing Pat McMahon after the Gators failed to receive an NCAA tournament bid in either 2006 or 2007.  Florida is O'Sullivan's first head coaching job; he is the twenty-first head coach in the history of the Gators baseball program.  He spent the previous nine seasons as an assistant coach for the Clemson Tigers baseball team of Clemson University under head coach Jack Leggett, first as the Tigers' pitching coach and recruiting coordinator, and later as Leggett's associate head coach.  During his tenure at Clemson, twenty-nine of the pitchers he coached were selected in the MLB Draft.

In each of his four seasons coaching the Gators, O'Sullivan's teams have improved their overall win–loss record and Southeastern Conference (SEC) standing.  In 2008, his first season as the Gators' skipper, the team finished 34–24 overall, 17–13 in SEC play, in second place in the SEC Eastern Division standings and third in the overall SEC standings.  In 2009, the Gators compiled an overall record of 42–22, 19–11 in the SEC, in first place in the SEC East.  O'Sullivan's 2010 Gators finished with an overall win–loss record of 47–17, 22–8 in SEC play, and SEC regular season champions.  In each of his first three seasons, his Gators also showed post-season improvement, too: early elimination in the NCAA Regional in 2008; progressing to the NCAA Super Regional in 2009; and a berth in the College World Series in 2010.

In 2011, the Gators finished the regular season 41–15 overall, 22–8 in the SEC, and SEC regular season co-champions—sharing the regular season conference championship with the South Carolina Gamecocks and Vanderbilt Commodores.  After winning the SEC tournament, O'Sullivan's Gators received the No. 2 seed in the 2011 NCAA tournament, and advanced to their second consecutive College World Series, ultimately finishing as the national runner-up.

O'Sullivan has also enjoyed recruiting success: his 2009 recruiting class was ranked No. 1 in the country by Collegiate Baseball Newspaper and Baseball America.  It was the first time in Gators baseball history that a recruiting class was ranked No. 1.

Through O'Sullivan's first four regular seasons as the Gators' head coach, his Gators teams compiled the best conference win–loss record of 80–40 (.667), just ahead of the South Carolina Gamecocks (75–45) and Vanderbilt Commodores (65–51).

Personal 

O'Sullivan has one daughter, Payton, born in December 2010, and son, Finn, born in September 2012.

Head coaching record

See also 

 Florida Gators
 History of the University of Florida
 List of current NCAA Division I baseball coaches
 List of University of Virginia alumni
 University Athletic Association
 Virginia Cavaliers

Notes

References

1968 births
Living people
Baseball coaches from Florida
Baseball catchers
Cape Cod Baseball League coaches
Clemson Tigers baseball coaches
Florida Atlantic Owls baseball coaches
Florida Gators baseball coaches
Virginia Cavaliers baseball coaches
Virginia Cavaliers baseball players
FSC Jacksonville Blue Wave baseball coaches
FSC Jacksonville Blue Wave baseball players
Minor league baseball coaches
People from Goshen, New York
People from Jupiter, Florida
Baseball players from Florida